The following list is composed of items, techniques and processes that were invented by or discovered by people from Spain.

Spain was an important center of knowledge during the medieval era. While most of western and southern Europe suffered from the collapse of the Roman Empire, although declining, some regions of the former empire, Hispania (the Iberian Peninsula), southern Italy, and the remainder of the Eastern Roman Empire or Byzantine Empire, did not to suffer from the full impact of the so-called Dark Ages when education collapsed with the collapse of the empire and most knowledge was lost. The Islamic conquests of places such as Egypt, which was a major part of the Byzantine Empire, and other places which were centers of knowledge in earlier times, gave the Muslims access to knowledge from many cultures which they translated into Arabic and recorded in books for the use of their own educated elites, who flourished in this period, and took with them to the Hispania after it fell under Muslim control. Much of this knowledge was later translated by Christian and Jewish scholars in the Christian kingdoms of the Reconquista from Arabic into Latin, and from there it spread through Europe.

Inventions and discoveries from the Golden Age of Al Andalus 
Note: Although these inventions were created on the Iberian Peninsula, that does not mean they were not made by people of Spanish  heritage due to the area being part of the Islamic Empire.
 Alcohol distillation
 Mercuric oxide, first synthesized by Abu al-Qasim al-Qurtubi al-Majriti (10th century).
 Modern surgery. Abu al-Qasim al-Zahrawi (936–1013 AD), better known in the west as Albucasis, is regarded as the father of modern surgery and is the most quoted surgeon of all times. Albucasis invented over 200 tools for use in surgery  - many still in use today.
 Water and weight driven mechanical clocks, by Spanish Muslim engineers sometime between 900–1200 AD. According to historian Will Durant, a watch like device was invented by Ibn Firnas.

Animation 
 M-Tecnofantasy - is an animation technique, created by Francisco Macián Blasco, that animators use to trace over motion picture footage, frame by frame, to produce realistic action similar to rotoscopy.

Architecture and construction 
 Azulejo
 Calatrava style - The futuristic style of architecture invented and designed by world renown Spanish architect, Santiago Calatrava. Examples include the Ciutat de les Arts i les Ciències, in Valencia, the planned Chicago Spire, Puente del Alamillo, in Seville, and the new World Trade Center Transportation Hub at rebuilt New World Trade Center site in New York City.
 Catalan Gothic
 Catalan Modernisme - a very influential style of architecture used not only in Catalonia but throughout Spain. Its greatest pioneer was the most famous architect Antoni Gaudi and his masterpiece, La Sagrada Familia.
 Hacienda
 Herrerian
 Horseshoe arch was first used in Visigothic Spain.
 Isabelline Gothic
 Valencian Gothic
 Valencian Art Nouveau
 Levantine Gothic
 Masia
 Mozarabic
 Mudéjar style
 Neo-Mudéjar
 Palloza
 Pazo
 Plateresque
 Purism architecture
 Repoblación
 Spanish Colonial Architecture
 Spanish Tile
 Visigothic

Chemistry 
 First process of creating artificial crystals by Ibn Firnas.
 Pure alcohol distillation
 Modern toxicology, by Mateu Orfila (1787–1853).
 Discovery of vanadium (as vanadinite) in 1801 by geologist and chemist Andrés Manuel del Río (1764–1849) 
 Discovery of tungsten by Fausto Elhuyar and his brother Juan José Elhuyar in 1783.
 Discovery of platinum by scientist, soldier and author Antonio de Ulloa (1716–1795) with Jorge Juan y Santacilia (1713–1773).
 Discovery of carbon monoxide and pure alcohol by alchemist and physician Arnold of Villanova (c. 1235–1311)

Computing and Communications 
 Telekino, pioneering of remote control, by engineer and mathematician Leonardo Torres y Quevedo (1852–1936) 
 Electronic book by  teacher, writer and inventor Ángela Ruiz Robles (1895-1975).

Cuisine
 Chocolate caliente (hot chocolate) - the Mesoamericans drank chocolate strait bitter and sometimes flavored with spicy peppers. Spanish conquistadors were not fans of the original mix and instead created their own sweeten hot chocolate by adding sugar from sugar cane. For many years, the Spanish kept their prized chocolate a secret until its expansion into other European courts.
 Chorizo
 Jamón ibérico
 Spanish omelette
 Jerez - also known as Sherry
 Paella
 Spanish cuisine

Economics 
 Development of the first monetarist theory and the quantitative theory of money by economist Martín de Azpilcueta (1492–1586), member of the School of Salamanca.
 Precursor of international law theory by Francisco de Vitoria (c. 1480/86 – 1546), member of the School of Salamanca
 First world currency

Fashion 
Spain has been a center of fashion since medieval times. Barcelona and Madrid have both been named as fashion capitals of the world, with Barcelona being the fifth most important fashion capital in the world back in 2015. Spain is the home country of the largest fashion retail store and textiles designer in the world, Zara and its parent Inditex, making their CEO main shareholder, Amancio Ortega Gaona, the second wealthiest man in the world in 2015. Barcelona is the headquarters of another international retail company, Mango.

Inventions:
 Farthingale
 Spray-on-clothing by Manel Torres

Mathematics and statistics 
 Borda Count - by Ramon Llull, around 1299, centuries before Jean-Charles de Borda.
 Condorcet criterion - by Ramon Llull, around 1299, centuries before Nicolas de Condorcet.
 Contributions to the field of Dynamical Systems by Ricardo Pérez-Marco
 Nualart stochastic processes and stochastic analysis (field of probability theory).
 Speculative Arithmetic
 Gregorian calendar - reforms from the Julian calendar to the Gregorian calendar by Spanish mathematician, Pedro Chacón.
 Geostatistical Analysis of Compositional Data by Vera Pawlowsky-Glahn and Ricardo A. Olea.
 Group Theory and Lie algebras works done by Maria Wonenburger (1927–2014).
 Integral geometry by Luís Antoni Santaló Sors
 Modelling and Analysis of Compositional Data by Vera Pawlowsky-Glahn, Juan José Egozcue, Raimon Tolosana-Delgado
 Nonlinear partial differential equations and their applications by Juan Luis Vázquez Suárez
 Oscillation theory of the obliquity of the ecliptic by Abū Isḥāq Ibrāhīm ibn Yaḥyā al-Naqqāsh al-Zarqālī, also known as Al-Zarqali or Ibn Zarqala (1029–1087).
 Spherical Trigonometry - work of Abū Abd Allāh Muḥammad ibn Muʿādh al-Jayyānī (989–1079 AD). Greatly influenced Western mathematics, including the works of Regiomontanus.
 Tirocinio aritmético by María Andrea Casamayor (1700–1780)
 Works of Enrique Zuazua in applied mathematics in the fields of partial differential equations, control theory and numerical analysis

Medicine and biology 

 Synthesis of ribonucleic acid (RNA) by Nobel prize Laureate Severo Ochoa (1905–1993).
 Neuroscience by Nobel prize Laureate (1906) Santiago Ramón y Cajal (1852–1934).
 Discovery of the microglia or Hortega cell by the neuroscientist Pío del Río Hortega (1882–1945) 
 Discovery that the human cell has 46 chromosomes - jointly discovered with a Swedish scientist.
 Discovery that the parasitic agent of Chagas disease, Trypanosoma cruzi, reproduce by cloning - discovered by Francisco J. Ayala.
 The effect of hormone levels on the mind - crucial to forming a relationship between psychology and endocrinology, by Gregorio Marañón.
 First European description of pulmonary circulation by scientist, surgeon and humanist Miguel Servet (1511–1553) 
 A worldwide used "two-piece" disposable syringe (1978) by Manuel Jalón Corominas (1925–2011) 
 Use of Radiology and Radiotherapy  for diagnostics by Celedonio Calatayud (1880-1931).
 Animal Testing, first recorded use of animals for medical testing was done by Ibn Zuhr, known as Avenzoar, (1094–1162).
 Antiseptics were in used as early as the 10th century in hospitals in Islamic Spain. Special protocols, in Al Andalus, were used to keep hygiene before and after surgery.
Botany, Spanish botanist, like Ibn al-Baitar, created hundreds of works/catalogs on the various plants in not only Europe but the Middle East, Africa and Asia. In these works many processes for extracting essential oils, drugs as well as their uses can be found.
 The CRISPR System - Discovered by Francisco Mojica, from the University of Alicante. The discovery of the CRISPR system is the discovery of the 21st century in the fields of medicine, genetics, virology, immunology, biochemistry and molecular biology. This new technology has revolutionized research in genetics and biochemistry and molecular biology. The CRISPR revolution brings us new tools to edit genomes with great accuracy and precision. It may one day help us cure genetic disorders and cancers.
 Ectopic pregnancy - first described by Al-Zahrawi (936–1013 AD).
 Eye glasses, first invented by Ibn Firnas in the 9th century.
 Inheritance of traits first proposed by Abu Al-Zahrawi (936–1013 AD) more than 800 years before Austrian monk, Mendel. Al-Zahrawi was first to record and suggest that hemophilia was an inherited disease.
 Inhalation anesthesia, invented by al-Zahrawi and Ibn Zuhr. Used a sponge soaked with narcotic drugs and placed it on patients face.
 Laryngoscope by singer, music educator,  and vocal pedagogue Manuel García (1805–1906).

 Ligatures, described in the work of al-Zahrawi (936–1013 AD), Kitab al-Tasrif, one of the most influential books in early modern medicine. Describes the process of performing a ligature on blood vessels.
 Migraine surgery, first performed by al-Zahrawi (936–1013 AD).
 Modern surgery. Abu al-Qasim al-Zahrawi (936–1013 AD), better known in the west as Albucasis, is regarded as the father of modern surgery and is the most quoted surgeon of all times. Albucasis invented over 200 tools for use in surgery - many still in use today.
 Nuubo - Wearable medical technology that measures heart rate, blood pressure, perspiration, body temperature and current location.
 Pathology - various Muslim physicians in Spain were crucial in the development of modern medicine. Pathology, obviously was an important development in medicine. The first correct proposal of the nature of disease was described by al-Zahrawi and Ibn Zuhr.
 Pharmacopoeia (book of medicine). During the 14th century, the physician from Malaga, Ibn Baytar, wrote a pharmacopoeia naming over 1400 different drugs and their uses in medicine. This book was written 200 years before the supposed first pharmacopoeia was written by German scholar in 1542.
 Silver bromide method.
 Wheelchair - first European design for the use of the most powerful man in the world at the time, King Phillip II of Spain, who was suffering from gout.
 Yellow Fever Transmission - Luis Alvarez, born in Havana, Cuba (then Kingdom of Spain) was first to discover that Yellow Fever was transmitted through mosquitoes Aedes aegypti.

Meteorology 
 The barocyclometer, the nephoscope, and the microseismograph by meteorologist José María Algué (1856–1930).

Military 
First amphibious landing of tanks at Alhucemas bay in 1925 and a precursor of Allied amphibious operations in World War II.
Destructor - The main precursor of the destroyer type of warship, laid down in 1885.
 Training of aggressive dogs for warfare.
 Falcata swords used by Iberian tribes.
 Gladius Hispanensis (antennae swords) - Swords adopted by the Romans after the second Punic war. The Iberian sword was considered superior to that of the Romans.
 Guerrilla warfare developed in Spain during the Napoleonic invasion of the Iberian peninsula.
 Miquelet lock was invented by gunsmiths in Madrid during the late 16th century (circa 1570).
 Molotov cocktails were first developed in Spain during the Spanish civil war and were ordered to be used by the Nationalist forces against Soviet T-26 tanks supporting the Spanish Republic.
Peral Submarine, design of the first fully operative military submarine by Isaac Peral (1851–1895).
First professional army in Europe – men were hired and trained in Spain to join the army as their professional job not as some levy or through hiring mercenaries.
Rapier - Spain was the first European country to use rapiers.
First use of a rotorcraft in combat, during the suppression of the Asturias Rebellion in 1934
Tercios greatly modernized fighting in Europe. It is seen by military historians as one of the great developments of combined arms and tactics for warfare. The Spanish Tercios were undefeated in every war until Battle of Rocroi in 1643 and were greatly feared as an invincible army.
 Toledo steel - The Iberian region has been known for high quality metal working and sword productions since pre-Roman times. Toledo steel refers to both the high quality steel and that legacy of steel work in the Iberian peninsula from pre-Roman to post-Roman times in the Middle Ages. Damascus steel was said to be the only rival of Toledo steel in the Middle Ages.

Musical Instruments
 Alboka
 Bandurria
 Botet
 Catalan shawm
 Classical guitar
 Chácaras
 Dulzaina
 Fiscorn
 Flabiol
 Gaita Asturiana
 Gaita de boto
 Gaita gastoreña
 Gaita de saco
 Gaita sanabresa
 Galician gaita
 Gralla
 Guitarra de canya
 Kirikoketa
 Nunun
 Palmas
 Psalterium
 Reclam de xeremies
 Sac de gemecs
 Tambori
 Timple
 Trikiti
 Trompa de Ribagorza
 Txalaparta
 Txistu
 Violí de bufa
 Xeremia
 Xirula

Sociology, Philosophy and Politics
 Anarcho-syndicalism
 Averroism - the school of philosophy founded by Al-Andalus philosopher Averroes. Averroes in one of the most quoted men of the medieval era and has greatly influenced Western Europe.
 Balance of Powers
 Borda Count - by Ramon Llull, around 1299, centuries before Jean-Charles de Borda
 Condorcet criterion - by Ramon Llull, around 1299, centuries before Nicolas de Condorcet
 Expropriative anarchism
 International Law - According to the main argument agreed at Salamance, the common good of the world is of a category superior to the good of each state. This meant that relations between states ought to pass from being justified by force to being justified by law and justice. Hence calling for international law.
 Justification of war - argued greatly in the School of Salamanca. The main argument was given that war is one of the worst evils suffered by mankind, the adherents of the School reasoned that it ought to be resorted to only when it was necessary in order to prevent an even greater evil. A diplomatic agreement is preferable, even for the more powerful party, before a war is started. Even war for the conversion of pagans and infidels was considered unjust at the school of Salamanca.
 Maimonides
 Razon Historica
 Raciovitalismo
 Rights of People - Francisco de Vitoria is the first western European to argue for the rights of man and is considered the father of modern rights of people theory. His most famous work is Ius Gentium (Latin for The Rights of People)
 Stoicism - Some of the most important stoic philosophical works are by Iberian born or descendent philosophers including the works of Seneca the younger, born in Cordoba, as well as the stoic masterpiece, Meditations, by Roman emperor, Marcus Aurelius, born in Rome but whose family originate in Ucubi, Spain (small town close to Cordoba).
 Second Scholasticism - Francisco Suarez is considered the most important European scholastic after Thomas Aquinas.
 School of Salamanca Movement - greatly intertwined with second scholasticism, but it was the rise in philosophical works on politics, ethics, religion, society and human rights. As we know, our modern concept of human rights, equality and liberty originate in the enlightenment revolutions, especially in France and US, however, about  300–200 years before the enlightenment, the great scholars of the University of Salamanca were writing and discussing the same ideas. The ideas of international law, balance of powers, civil law, order, and just war were all discussed and debated by these Spanish scholars. Francisco Suarez is the most famous Salamancan scholar of this era. Is considered the most important European scholastic after Thomas Aquinas.

Transportation 
 Autogyro by Juan de la Cierva,  pioneer of rotary flight, direct precursor of the helicopter.
 Steam engine by Jerónimo de Ayanz y Beaumont, the invention of a steam-powered water pump for draining mines, for which he was granted a patent by the Spanish monarchy in 1606.
 First machine powered submarine by Narcís Monturiol (1818–1885)

Physics and Astronomy
 Equatorium
 Theoretical work on Gravity by Juan Bautista Villalpando (born 1552 in Córdoba, died 22 May 1608). He may be the father of gravitational theory and influence Newton, who indeed had copies of Bautista's work on gravity, geometry and architecture. Baustista produced 21 original propositions on the center of gravity and the line of direction.
 First full-pressured space suit, called the escafandra estratonáutica, designed and made by Emilio Herrera Linares, in 1935. The Russians then used a model of Herrera's suit when first flying into space of which the Americans would then later adopt when creating their own space program.
 First planetarium by Ibn Firnas.
 speed of sound, was proposed by physicist from Cordoba, Ibn Hazm (994–1064 AD). Ibn Hazm argued and calculated the speed of sound by echoes in the Mosque of Cordoba. He is also credited as being the first to propose that thunder was a production of lightning.
 Spherical Earth Theory by Ibn Hazm (994-1064 AD).
 Tables of Toledo
 Viscoelastic gravity layer
 Water and weight driven mechanical clocks, by Spanish Muslim engineers sometime between 900–1200 AD. According to historian Will Durant, a watch like device was invented by Ibn Firnas.
 Magnetic wormhole - first ever manmade wormhole created at the Universitat Autonoma de Barcelona by Spanish physicist Jordi Prat-Camps. The magnetic wormhole makes the magnetic field invisible.

Miscellaneous 
 Modern rules of chess. Although chess has its origins in India, the modern rules of chess have their origin Spain. It is still under debate whether the rules were invented in the Islamic period or after the Christian reconquest of Toledo.
 El Ajedrecista, invention of the automatic chess by engineer and mathematician Leonardo Torres y Quevedo (1852–1936) 
 The first stapler, designed and created in the Basque country of Spain for French King, Louis XV, in the 18th century. The staples had engraved on them the royal emblem.
 First cigarette. The mesoamericans, like the Mayans and Aztecs smoked tobacco by using different leaves as rolling paper, the Spanish were the first to manufacture the grandfather of the modern day cigarette. When tobacco first made it onto Spanish shores in the 17th century, maize wrappers were used to roll and then fine paper.
 The oldest folding/pocket knife have been found during the Iron Age (pre-Roman times)in Spain. The title is contested with folding knives found in Hallstatt culture region in Austria from around the same time.
 Foosball. The first patent for table football belonged to Spaniard, Alejandro Finisterre, though he credits his friend, Francisco Javier Altuna, with the invention.
 Glass mirrors, used in Islamic Spain as early as 11th century – 200 years prior to the Venetians.

See also
 List of Spanish inventors and discoverers
 Science and technology in Spain

References

Inventions and discoveries
Lists of inventions or discoveries